Manuel David Carmona Escobedo (born 12 July 1984) is a Spanish footballer who plays for CA Espeleño as a left winger.

Club career

Maldives
Reaching a deal with New Radiant as the 2014 Dhivehi League got underway, Carmona supplied two goals and two assists on debut, helping them go top of the table. Comparing the Maldivian league to the Segunda Division B, the Spaniard claimed that teams there tended to be more conservative, scooping up the 2014 Best Foreign Player Award as well as the league title and President's Cup that year before swapping clubs for BG Sports.

Discussing his season in the Maldives, he revealed that it felt more stable there and was tired of the situation in Spain with the lower tiers, where he earned less; he also added that there were almost no fans present at games, the more popular sport being cricket. Despite this, the former Cordoba CF reserve stated that his time with New Radiant left an indelible mark on his career.

References

External links 
 
 
 

1984 births
Living people
Footballers from Córdoba, Spain
Spanish footballers
Association football wingers
Segunda División players
Segunda División B players
Tercera División players
Divisiones Regionales de Fútbol players
Córdoba CF B players
Córdoba CF players
Valencia CF Mestalla footballers
CF Extremadura footballers
AD Alcorcón footballers
CD Alcalá players
CF Villanovense players
CD Badajoz players
CD Puertollano footballers
AD Ceuta footballers
New Radiant S.C. players
Spanish expatriate footballers
Spanish expatriates in the Maldives
Expatriate footballers in the Maldives